The R-36 is a family of intercontinental ballistic missiles (ICBMs) and space launch vehicles (Tsyklon) designed by the Soviet Union during the Cold War. The original R-36 was deployed under the GRAU index 8K67 and was given the NATO reporting name SS-9 Scarp.  It was able to carry three warheads and was the first Soviet MRV (multiple re-entry vehicle) missile.  The later version, the R-36M was produced under the GRAU designations 15A14 and 15A18 and was given the NATO reporting name SS-18 Satan. This missile was viewed by certain United States analysts as giving the Soviet Union first strike advantage over the U.S., particularly because of its rapid silo-reload ability, very heavy throw weight and extremely large number of re-entry vehicles. Some versions of the R-36M were deployed with 10 warheads and up to 40 penetration aids and the missile's high throw-weight made it theoretically capable of carrying more warheads or penetration aids. Contemporary U.S. missiles, such as the Minuteman III, carried up to three warheads at most.

The R-36 became the base for the Tsyklon launch vehicles family. As of early 2021, Cyclone-4M, the last Tsyklon variant in development, is planned for launch in 2023 from Canso, Nova Scotia.

Some R-36 missiles have been converted into Dnepr medium-lift launch vehicles, capable of putting up to 4,500 kg into orbit.

History 

Development of the R-36 was begun by OKB-586 (Yuzhnoye) in Dnepropetrovsk, Ukraine (at the time part of the Soviet Union) in 1962, and built upon the work of the R-16 program. The Chief Designer was Mikhail Yangel. Initial development was of light, heavy, and orbital versions, with flight testing from 1962 through 1966, at which time initial operational capability was achieved. News of the development of the orbital version caused alarm in the West with the possibility that the Soviets would be able to launch a large number of nuclear weapons into orbit where there was no capability to intercept them. Weapons could potentially be left orbiting for an indefinite period. The prospect of orbital nuclear weapons led both sides to agree to a treaty banning the basing of weapons of mass destruction in space.

In 1970, development of a fourth version, capable of delivering multiple warheads, was begun, which was test flown the next year.

Further improvement of the R-36 led to the design of the R-36M, which provided a theoretical first-strike capability—the ability to destroy the United States' LGM-30 Minuteman ICBM silos and launch control centers before they could retaliate. However, neither the Soviet Union nor the Russian Federation have ever publicly delineated the missile's particular role in their arsenal. The initial design of the R-36M called for a single massive 12 Mt warhead to be delivered over a range of 10,600 km. The missile was first tested in 1973 but this test ended in failure. After several delays the R-36M was deployed in December 1975. This design was delivered with a single 18–20 Mt warhead and a range of just over 11,000 km. This new version was given a new codename by NATO: SS-18 Satan.

The R-36M has gone through six separate variants, with the first being phased out by 1984. The final variant designated R-36M-2 "Voevoda" (NATO codename SS-18 mod 6) was deployed in August 1988. This missile could deliver the same 18–20 Mt warhead 16,000 km. Prior variants mainly introduced MIRV (Multiple independent reentry vehicles) warheads. These missiles surpassed their western counterpart, the US LGM-118 Peacekeeper in terms of megatons delivered, range, and survivability, but were inferior in terms of accuracy (CEP).

The control system for this rocket was designed at NPO "Electropribor" (Kharkiv, Ukraine).

Deployment 

At full deployment, before the fall of the Soviet Union in 1991, 308 R-36M launch silos were operational. After the breakup of the USSR, 204 of these were located on the territory of the Russian Federation and 104 on the territory of newly independent Kazakhstan. In the next few years Russia reduced the number of R-36M launch silos to 154 to conform with the START I treaty. Part of the missiles in Kazakhstan (54 of them) were under the 57th Rocket Division at Zhangiz-Tobe (Solnechnyy), Semipalatinsk Oblast. The other R-36 establishment in Kazakhstan was the 38th Rocket Division at Derzhavinsk, Turgay Oblast. The dismantling of 104 launchers located in Kazakhstan was completed in September 1996. The START II treaty was to eliminate all R-36M missiles but it did not enter into force and the missiles remained on duty. Russia has steadily decreased the number of operational R-36Ms and as of March 2013, only 55 (all of the 10 MIRV R-36M2 version) remain.
About 40 missiles will have their service lives extended so that they remain in service until about 2020. With the retirement of the 20 megaton R-36M2 warheads, the highest yield weapon in service with any nation is the estimated 5 Mt Chinese Dong Feng 5 (DF-5) ICBM (CSS-4) warhead and the Russian UR-100N 5 Mt rocket.

US Air Force National Air and Space Intelligence Center estimates that as of June 2017 about 50 R-36M2 launchers were operationally deployed.

Elimination 

In the last decade Russian armed forces have been steadily reducing the number of R-36M missiles in service, withdrawing those that age past their designed operational lifetime. About 40 missiles of the most modern variant R-36M2 (or RS-20V) will remain in service until 2019. As of January 2020, the Strategic Missile Troops had  46 R-36M2s in active service.

In March 2006 Russia made an agreement with Ukraine that will regulate cooperation between the two countries on maintaining the R-36M2 missiles. It was reported that the cooperation with Ukraine will allow Russia to extend the service life of the R-36M2 missiles by at least ten to 28 years.

According to Interfax report, two R-36M2 missiles are planned to be dismantled by November 30, 2020. The process is to be carried out in accordance with the New START procedures.

Design

Multiple warheads 

Missiles of the R-36M family have never been deployed with more than ten warheads, but given their large throw-weight (8.8 tonnes as specified in START), they have the capacity to carry considerably more detonation power. Among the projects that the Soviet Union considered in the mid-1970s was that of a 15A17 missile—a follow-on to the R-36MUTTKh (15A18). The missile would have had an even greater throw-weight—9.5 tonnes—and would be able to carry a very large number of warheads. Five different versions of the missile were considered. Three of these versions would carry regular warheads —  yield,  yield, or  yield. However, none of these upgraded models were ever developed. The SALT II Treaty, signed in 1979, prohibited increasing the number of warheads ICBMs could carry. Equally, from a strategic point of view, concentrating so many warheads on silo-based missiles was not seen as desirable, since it would have made a large proportion of the USSR's warheads vulnerable to a counterforce strike.

The operational deployment of the R-36M consisted of the R-36MUTTKh, which carried ten 500 kt warheads, and its follow-on, the R-36M2 (15A18M), which carried ten 800 kt warheads (single-warhead versions with either 8.3 Mt or 20 Mt warhead also existed at some point). To partially circumvent the treaty, the missile was equipped with 40 decoys to utilize the capacity left unused due to the 10-warhead limitation. These decoys would appear as warheads to any defensive system, making each missile as hard to intercept as 50 single warheads, rendering potential anti-ballistic defense ineffective.

Silo hardness 
A US military estimate circa 1994 said "... those SS-18 silos have since been assessed to be much harder than  ..."

Variants

R-36 (SS-9)

R-36 
The R-36 is a two-stage rocket powered by a liquid bipropellant, with UDMH as fuel and nitrogen tetroxide as an oxidizer. It carries one of two types of re-entry vehicles (RVs) developed especially for this missile:
 Single nuclear warhead of 20 megatons TNT (NATO codename SS-9 Mod 1).
 Single nuclear warhead of 8.3 megatons TNT (NATO codename SS-9 Mod 2).

The first launch of an R-36 took place on September 28, 1963, and ended ignominiously when the missile lost thrust one second after liftoff and fell back onto the pad, causing a fire.
This debacle led to program director V.P. Petrov being fired and replaced by V.N. Soloviev. LC-67/1 was repaired and the next test took place successfully on December 3. Subsequent testing went better, however, LC-80/1 had to be rebuilt following another launch accident on January 13, 1965. Two months later, an R-36 caught fire during propellant loading on LC-67/1 and exploded, putting the pad out of commission for nine months. During test launch #17 (October 10, 1964), the warhead was retrieved with a parachute. Flight tests of the rocket were completed by May 20, 1968, and on November 19 of the same year it entered service. The first (and only) regiment with 18 launchers was deployed on August 25, 1969. A total of 139 8K67s flew between 1963 and 1975 with 16 failures.

The  Tsyklon series of civilian space launchers from Ukraine is based on the R-36orb (8К69) or R-36-O (capital O for Orbital) design. The R-36-O launched many orbital satellites (like Cosmos 160, SATCAT 2806, on 17 May 1967) in the 1960s and 1970s as part of the FOBS weapons program.

R-36M (SS-18 Mod 1) 
In January 1971, cold-launch tests began during which the mortar launch was perfected. The actual flight tests for the missile began on 21 February 1973, though some sources suggest that testing began in October 1972. The testing phase of the R-36M with various different types of warheads was finished in October 1975 and on 30 December 1975 deployment began (though some Western sources suggest that an initial operational capability was reached in early 1975). A total of 56 were deployed by 1977, though all were replaced by R-36MUTTKh missiles by 1984. These high-yield weapons were assessed in the West as possibly developed to attack American Minuteman ICBM launch control centers.

R-36M (SS-18 Mod 2) 
The MIRVs were placed in pairs, and a post boost vehicle with a command structure and a propulsion system were contained in the nose cone of the R-36M. The flight tests of this variant began in September 1973 (though some Western sources suggest that the initial flight test occurred in August 1973), with IOC in 1975. Approximately 132 were deployed by 1978, but the post-boost vehicle design was seriously flawed, and all missiles were replaced by R-36MUTTKh by 1983.

R-36MUTTKh (SS-18 Mod 3) 
Variant of the R-36MUTTKh with a single large reentry vehicle that was an improved version of the R-36M. On 16 August 1976, a few months after the R-36M entered service, the development of an improved modification of the R-36M (15A14) was approved. This missile subsequently received the designation R-36MUTTKh (15A18) and was developed by KB Yuzhnoye (OKB-586) through December 1976. The R-36MUTTKh was capable of carrying two different nose cones. On 29 November 1979, deployment of the improved R-36M with a single reentry vehicle carrying an 18–25 Mt warhead began. This variant is no longer in service.

R-36MUTTKh (SS-18 Mod 4) 
Variant of the R-36MUTTKh with multiple warheads. It was probably designed to attack and destroy ICBMs and other hardened targets in the US. Its increasing accuracy made it possible to reduce the yield of the warheads and allowed an increase in the number of warheads from 8 to 10. According to some Western estimates, evidence suggested that it may be capable of carrying as many as 14 RVs (this may reflect observation of the deployment of countermeasures intended to overcome a ballistic missile defense, or to confuse American attack characterization systems). The flight-design tests of the R-36MUTTKh began on 31 October 1977 and in November 1979 the flight tests of the MIRVed missile were completed. The first three regiments were put on alert on 18 September 1979. During 1980 a total of 120 missiles were deployed, replacing the last remaining R-36 missiles. In 1982–1983 the remaining R-36M missiles were also replaced with the new R-36MUTTKh and the total number of deployed missiles reached the maximum 308 ceiling established in the SALT-1 treaty. The R-36MUTTKh force had the estimated capability to destroy 65 to 80 percent of US ICBM silos using two nuclear warheads against each. Even after this type of attack, it was estimated that more than 1000 R-36MUTTKh warheads would be available for further strikes against targets in the US. After 2009, the R-36MUTTKh were all eliminated in favor of the newer R-36M2.

R-36M2 Voevoda (SS-18 Mod 5) 
This newer, more accurate version placed in converted silos allowed the R-36M family to remain the bulwark of the SRF’s hard-target-kill capability. The R-36M2 carries 10 MIRVs, each having a nearly twice the yield of the R-36MUTTKh warheads according to Western estimates (approximately 750 kt to 1 Mt), though Russian sources suggest a yield of 550–750 kt each. The increase in the R-36M2's warhead yield, along with improved accuracy, would, under the START treaty, help allow the Russians to maintain their hard-target-kill wartime requirements even with the 50 percent cut in heavy ICBMs the START agreement required. The technical proposals to build a modernized heavy ICBM were made in June 1979. The missile subsequently received the designation R-36M2 Voevoda and the industrial index number 15A18M. The design of the R-36M2 was completed in June 1982. The R-36M2 had a series of new engineering features. The engine of the second stage is completely built into the fuel tank (earlier this was only used on SLBMs) and the design of the transport-launching canister was altered. Unlike the R-36M, the 10 warheads on the post-boost vehicle are located on a special frame in two circles. The flight tests of the R-36M2 equipped with 10 MIRVs began in March 1986 and were completed in March 1988. The first regiment with these missiles was put on alert on 30 July 1988 and was deployed on 11 August 1988. This is the only variant still operational.

One of the missile's most important features is its storage/basing in a container, inserted in the silo. The container doubles as a mortar barrel – it has a "piston" at its bottom, beneath the missile. The drum-like "piston" is filled with a slow-burning, gas pressure-generating charge that pushes, mortar-like, the missile from the container. Only when several meters above the silo with the now empty container the "piston" is pushed sideways by a small rocket motor to avoid being accelerated towards the silo by the ignition of the missile's main engine. Thus the silo is a) spared the burning-out by the main engine flames, and so b) the empty container could be quickly removed and a new container with missile could be inserted by a ready transporter/erector into the intact silo, allowing for a second salvo before the adversary's warheads arrive. This feature was a deep concern for the US side during the SALT/START negotiations, as it gave Soviet Union the possibility to strike US targets again after the first missile exchange was concluded.

R-36M2 Voevoda (SS-18 Mod 6) 
The flight tests of the R-36M2 missile carrying a single warhead with a yield of 20 Mt were completed in September 1989 and deployment began in August 1991. Ten missiles were deployed. One intended use of these large warheads was high altitude detonation to incapacitate electronics and communications through a very large electromagnetic pulse, however, the most likely use would be against missile launch control centers as the stated purpose for which the R-36MUTTKh warheads were designed. These missiles were all decommissioned by late 2009.

Derivatives 
A proposal has been advanced to modify Voyevoda R-36M2 Satan heavy ICBMs to destroy incoming asteroids of up to 100 m, similar to the Chelyabinsk asteroid.

Operators 
 
The Strategic Missile Troops are the only operator of the R-36. As of January 2020, 46 silo-based missiles are deployed at:
 13th Red Banner Rocket Division at Yasny, Orenburg Oblast
 62nd Rocket Division at Uzhur, Krasnoyarsk Krai

Former operators

See also 
 RS-24 Yars
 RS-26 Rubezh
 RS-28 Sarmat
 UR-100N
 RT-2PM Topol
 RT-2PM2 Topol-M
 LGM-30 Minuteman
 LGM-25C Titan II
 Agni-V
 DF-5
 DF-41
 Hwasong-14 (uses same engine)

References 

 Podvig, Pavel (January 30, 2004). Russian Strategic Nuclear Forces. Cambridge, MA: The MIT Press.

External links 

 CSIS Missile Threat – SS-18 (Satan)
 Strategic Missile Troops
 R-36 missile
 Tour to the museum that houses Ukraine's nuclear past

R-036
R-036
Intercontinental ballistic missiles of Ukraine
MIRV capable missiles
Military equipment introduced in the 1960s